Soldier Boy is the name of three superhero characters in the comic book series Herogasm and The Boys, created by Garth Ennis and Darick Robertson. The first character introduced (the second successor to the mantle, made by Vought along with his predecessor to claim to be the same Soldier Boy who fought and died in World War II, kept in suspended animation until being revived in modern times) is the elected leader of the Vought-sponsored superhero team Payback, depicted as one of the only "Supes" (i.e. "superpowered" or "superhuman" individuals, often acting as "superheroes") with selfless, benevolent motivations, who detests the use of profanity, and annually has sex with Homelander alone at the "Herogasm" orgy instead of participating, under the mistaken hope that the "test" of doing so will convince Homelander to let him join his own superhero team, the Seven. After his most recent dalliance with Homelander, Soldier Boy is captured by CIA black ops agent Billy Butcher and brutally tortured and murdered by him for information on Homelander's recent activities. The original Soldier Boy is later revealed to have been mercy killed by Mallory during his first mission at the Battle of the Bulge, after his "Avenging Squad" inadvertently caused Mallory's men to be massacred, and been replaced by the second for the remainder of the war.

In the Amazon Prime Video streaming television adaptation, Soldier Boy (Ben) is introduced in the 2022 third season, portrayed by Jensen Ackles. A composite character of the comic book characters, this Soldier Boy is depicted as the first American  non-aging Supe, created by Frederick Vought during World War II, whom MM deems responsible for his family's downfall. A foul-mouthed "bonafide war hero", while working with the CIA during the Cold War as the leader of Payback, Soldier Boy was betrayed to the Russian government and experimented on for forty years. He is inadvertently freed by the Boys in the present-day while they were seeking the "superweapon" B.C.L. RED to use to kill Homelander, which in actuality is Soldier Boy himself, who, due to experimentation, can now emit an energy which negates the superpowers of any other Supes with whom it comes in contact. It is later revealed that Homelander is Soldier Boy's son. The character has received a positive reception.

Appearances

Comic book series

Soldier Boy III

Soldier Boy is introduced in Herogasm as the "elected" leader of the superhero team Payback. At the title annual orgy of Supes, he is said to have had sex with the Homelander alone every year out of the belief that he will let him join his own superhero team, the Seven (a promise which Homelander has no intention of fulfilling), primarily existing as comic relief. As the Homelander is inspired to begin planning a "Supe revolution" against Vought and their puppet rulers in the White House shortly after having sex with him for the most recent time, Soldier Boy remains obliviously standing by Homelander's side as he prepares to announce his plans, only for him to be interrupted by James Stillwell.

In The Boys arc "The Self-Preservation Society", Soldier Boy has his nose bitten off by CIA black ops agent Billy Butcher, the Homelander's archenemy and leader of the Boys, who begins to brutally beat and torture him for information on the Homelander and his activities over the next few days, mocking him for having claimed to be the same Soldier Boy who fought in World War II, kept alive by being frozen in suspended animation, an identity he was forced to assume and impersonate by Vought. In the "What I Know" arc, Butcher is revealed to have killed Soldier Boy with a public funeral being held for him and members of the Seven (including the Homelander) serving as his pallbearers.

Soldier Boy I

In The Boys arc "Barbary Coast", in precedence of telling "Wee Hughie" Campbell about the true sadistic nature of Billy Butcher, Lieutenant Colonel Greg D. Mallory tells him about his own history with Supes, beginning with his captaincy during World War II, when his company was made government and Vought officials to supervise the "Avenging Squad", a team of the first American-made Supes, led by the first Soldier Boy, during the Battle of the Bulge. While eager to serve, Soldier Boy had little military experience, and ordered the flying members of the team to inspect the area for a Nazi presence, oblivious to the fact that doing so would expose their position. Realizing what Soldier Boy had done, Mallory only had time to give his men a brief warning before the enemy (a nearby Waffen-SS platoon) attacked, massacring both his and Soldier Boy's men. After coming across a mortally wounded Soldier Boy, near-vertically bisected by a blast, in the aftermath, Mallory had then dropped a grenade by his feet before walking away, mercy killing him.

Soldier Boy II

Continuing to tell Hughie about his own past in The Boys arc "Barbary Coast", Mallory reveals that by 1950, he learned that new versions (new Supes under the same designs and branding) of Soldier Boy and his brethren had been created by Vought to replace them, fighting elsewhere, known as "Crimefighters Incorporated" after the war and making propaganda films for the United States government. This second Soldier Boy would eventually later die in unknown circumstances, and be succeeded by the third in modern times, presented by Vought (like the second) as the first still-alive Soldier Boy.

Television series

The Boys (2019–present)
In the 2022 third season of the television series adaptation, Jensen Ackles portrays a composite character based of the various comic book characters known as Soldier Boy, created by Nazi defector Frederick Vought during World War II in 1944, via injections of Compound V into a normal soldier. After being mentioned by Stan Edgar in the 2020 second season as an early test subject for Compound V, represented via a statue, Soldier Boy is said by Marvin T. "MM" Milk in the third season to be responsible for killing his grandfather whilst thwarting a carjacking, motivating his father's decision to "work himself to death" as a lawyer attempting to bring down Vought, and causing MM's OCD. Soldier Boy was said to have been killed while preventing a nuclear meltdown during the Cold War. Believing this story to be false, upon learning of the location of a Russian superweapon known as B.C.L. RED said to have actually killed Soldier Boy, Queen Maeve sends Billy Butcher to verify whether it did or not and then retrieve it, both hoping to potentially use the weapon to kill Homelander, the unstable leader of the Seven, due to Vought having equated him and Soldier Boy to have been on a similar to equal power level.

Interrogating and killing Soldier Boy's former sidekick Gunpowder after injecting himself with "V-24" given to him by Maeve, giving himself temporary superpowers, Butcher learns that Soldier Boy was actually killed during a joint black ops mission between his Supe team Payback and the CIA in Nicaragua in 1984, working against the Sandinistas, under the supervision of Butcher's own mentor, Grace Mallory. Confronting Mallory, Butcher learns that the vast majority of her men had been massacred by Russian and Nicaraguan troops in an ambush in 1984, and that while she did see Soldier Boy fight off several soldiers in the subsequent battle, she had been knocked out while avoiding friendly fire from Gunpowder, and only learned of Soldier Boy's death upon her awakening, caused by an unknown "superweapon" (B.C.L. RED), witnessed by his then-girlfriend the Crimson Countess. Not wanting it publicly known that the Russian government had the capability of killing Supes, the then-President, Ronald Reagan, had ordered the incident to be covered up, with Vought receiving full immunity. Unbeknownst to most people, Stan Edgar had organized the incident to get rid of Soldier Boy by allowing Noir and Payback to turn against him in revenge for his physical and mental abuse of his team members. The team managed to knock him out and leave him for the Russians, but not without Soldier Boy inflicting horrific burns and significant brain trauma upon Noir in retaliation.

After failing to track down the Crimson Countess in the present, Butcher and the Boys make their way to Russia and infiltrate the secret laboratory which Maeve believed to hold B.C.L. RED. After being overwhelmed by Russian soldiers, whom Butcher and Hughie Campbell then kill after taking more V-24, Butcher discovers and opens the B.C.L. RED. pod, only to find it contains a still-living, comatose, and bearded Soldier Boy. Inadvertently awakened from his induced coma, Soldier Boy exits the pod and releases a powerful radation blast from his chest, rendering Kimiko Miyashiro powerless and wounded (counteracting her usual regenerative abilities). The Boys retreat to stabilize her while Soldier Boy escapes, with Butcher surmising his new abilities to be a result of experimentation.

Soldier Boy returns to the United States by smuggling himself onto a commercial flight. While wandering New York City, he experiences a powerful flashback (triggered by hearing a song that was played whilst he was being experimented on), causing him to relive several traumatic moments while in Russian captivity. The ensuing rage triggers a destructive radioactive burst and he levels the better part of a five-story apartment complex, drawing the attention of Homelander as a potential new supervillain. After finding his way to "the Legend," a former Vought executive, he recovers his original uniform and confronts the Crimson Countess, who Butcher had restrained as a show of good faith in a bid to join forces with him (with MM being falsely led to believe was to use her as bait to kill Soldier Boy). After revealing his torture and disappointment that Payback never came to rescue him, she reveals that she, and the rest of Payback, secretly despised him and betrayed him to the Russians for no money, at which point he kills her with a radioactive burst.

After joining forces with Butcher and Hughie, with Soldier Boy agreeing to kill Homelander in exchange for them helping him track down and kill the remaining members of Payback, the group infiltrates Herogasm, an annual superhero orgy, hosted by Soldier Boys' former teammates TNT Twins. After the Twins claim Noir sold him out to the Russians, Soldier Boy suffers another PTSD episode and releases an energy blast, destroying the building, killing the Twins and multiple guests, and injuring others. Before the group can escape, they are confronted by Homelander. The group manages to overpower him after a fight, but Homelander is able to escape the energy blast in the nick of time.

While hunting another Payback member, Mindstorm, Soldier Boy starts to hear voices, which greatly concerns Hughie and Butcher. Butcher reveals to Hughie that he has supplied Soldier Boy with marijuana in order to keep him from having another destructive episode. After triggering a booby trap, Mindstorm attacks Butcher by forcing him to endlessly relive his traumatic past. Soldier Boy leaves Butcher for dead despite Hughie's protests. Later, Hughie confronts Soldier Boy about his PTSD, drug problem, and constant showboating of his military past; Hughie had previously learned from The Legend that Soldier Boy's service during the Second World War was mostly propaganda, having taken more active roles in suppressing race rioting and opposing the Civil Rights and peace movements, with there being "rumors about Dealey Plaza". Later, realizing the error of his ways, Hughie betrays Soldier Boy and saves Mindstorm, who in turn frees Butcher in return for being teleported to safety. Soldier Boy arrives soon afterward and kills Mindstorm, but not before learning from him Edgar's role in his capture and the reason for it: Edgar had used Soldier Boy's semen to create Homelander as a more powerful replacement. Later, Soldier Boy reveals the information to a shocked Homelander during a phone call to him.

After Soldier Boy informs Butcher and Hughie of the revelation that he is Homelander's father, the two, and later the rest of the Boys and Maeve, become concerned that he and Homelander will team up. He tells Butcher of his own privileged background, starkly contrasting with the more humble original story developed by Vought, which allowed him to enter Frederick Vought's Compound V trials; his father, a prominent steel magnate, neglected him and regarded him as a disappointment, disowning him and his new superhero persona as he had not earned his superpowers himself. Soldier Boy, Butcher, and Maeve go to Seven Tower to fight Homelander and Black Noir, detaining the Boys in a disused safe at the Flatiron Building. However, Homelander, having earlier killed Noir (for keeping his parentage secret) and retrieved Ryan, attempts to connect with Soldier Boy, saying that they and Ryan could be a family. After Soldier Boy disowns Homelander as weak, damaged, attention-seeking, and a disappointment, he attempts to blast him and fulfill his agreement with Butcher. However, after Ryan lasers Soldier Boy to stop him from attacking Homelander, and Soldier Boy makes the mistake of striking Ryan in retaliation, he ends up fighting Butcher, Annie, MM, and Kimiko, with Homelander reluctantly fighting Queen Maeve. When they attempt to use Novichok improvised by Frenchie to knock out Soldier Boy, he attempts to release an energy blast in retaliation. Before he can kill the Boys, a grievously-injured Maeve pushes him out of the window to save them, losing her own powers when he discharges mid-air and forced her to go into hiding. Soldier Boy is thereafter detained on Mallory's orders, with his statue in front of Seven Tower being toppled by supporters of both Homelander and Stormfront after Vought's news media wing reported that Soldier Boy's attack was motivated by Russian indoctrination.

Promotional material
Soldier Boy is mentioned and pictured throughout the 2020–2021 promotional web series Seven on 7 with Cameron Coleman, with the last film he had starred in, 1983's Red River, being released to Vought's new "Vought+" streaming service, while the The Boys Presents: Diabolical first season finale "One Plus One Equals Two" mentions Homelander to be the first Supe since Soldier Boy to hold the same level of "caliber" as him in the public eye; Eric Kripke additionally expressed interest in a future episode of Diabolical set in the comic series' continuity, like "I'm Your Pusher", adapting Soldier Boy III's and Homelander's sexual relationship, which was not adapted to the live-action series' different Soldier Boy I, with Ackles potentially also voicing the younger character.

To promote the character's appearances in the third season of The Boys, Jensen Ackles appeared in several videos depicting Soldier Boy's in-universe promotional campaigns for Vought and the United States government in the 1980s, in particular recording several anti-drug PSAs and serenading the dancers of Solid Gold with a spoken-word rendition of Blondie's "Rapture". Following the airing of this cover, Ackles additionally expressed interest in recording a potential album of similar cover works, tentatively entitled "Soldier Boy Sings The Hits".

Powers and abilities
The character was designed as a parody analogous to Marvel Comics' Captain America, a basic "supersoldier" trained in shield-fighting, who maintains a genuinely patriotic and innocent approach to his role, not realizing the depravity of the Supes around him (never resorting to foul language or joining his team during the "Herogasm" orgies, although he privately has sex with Homelander at each one, believing each encounter to be a "test" for him to join the Seven and leave Payback). He is in the habit of reciting the names of states while engaged in battle. It is claimed he fought in World War II, though Butcher claims otherwise and refers to this story as an insult to the people who really did; Soldier Boy is later revealed to be the third Supe to have taken the mantle, after the first was killed during his first mission and the second fought during the war only to die later. 

For the 2022 third season of the television adaptation, Soldier Boy was redesigned by Laura Jean "LJ" Shannon and Greg Hopwood as analogous to both Captain America, Superman, and the Winter Soldier, in particular the former's "Nomad" depiction in the 2018 Marvel Cinematic Universe (MCU) film Avengers: Infinity War, as portrayed by Chris Evans, with a practical pointed shield for defense and attack. Soldier Boy also possesses the ability to produce radiation that can be released from his chest in beams of energy or explosive burst, that can also fry the Compound V out of a Supe's system, courtesy of Soviet-era experimentation. Soldier Boy is frequently described as being nearly as strong as Homelander, which is proven in the episode Herogasm, where his superhuman strength and durability rivals that of Homelander, allowing him to fight him almost evenly. Soldier Boy is also shown to be a formidable hand-to-hand combatant as well, as he was able to overpower and defeat Butcher in their brawl when Butcher was empowered by Temp-V.

Development

Addressing Soldier Boy III's sexual relationship with Homelander in the Herogasm comic series, Eric Kripke confirmed that it would not be adapted to the television series adaptation, with Jensen Ackles instead portraying the original World War II-era heterosexual Soldier Boy I introduced in the "Barbary Coast" arc of The Boys, having survived the war into modern times (unlike the comic series), and been held prisoner and experimented on in a laboratory, in-and-out of an induced coma, from 1984 to 2022. Prior to Ackles' casting, Kripke intended to "cast an older actor, because we were going for like a grizzled John Wayne sort of vibe", before instead offering Ackles the role, whom he had previously worked with on the first five seasons of The CW's Supernatural, and who was "in contention for a brief time" (although did not audition) for the role of Steve Rogers / Captain America in the 2011 Marvel Cinematic Universe (MCU) film Captain America: The First Avenger (prior to Chris Evans's casting), a character of which Soldier Boy is a parody, with Ackles characterising them as "Captain America on his ass, [and] as if [he] gave up super-heroism and was just your drunk and inappropriate uncle". On the character's relationship with Homelander in the third season of the television series adaptation, Ackles stated that:

"Homelander is the new iteration of Soldier Boy. He's the new kid on the block in Soldier Boy's eyes. Going back to that toxic masculinity: very true to form, one of the first things that ever comes out of Soldier Boy's mouth after he looks at a big poster of Homelander is 'What the fuck?' It's just looking at the world around him, knowing he doesn't fit in and [that] things are different. And there it is, personified in this statuesque red, white and blue superhero. He's not thrilled about that. The relationship is immediately contentious. They have their words."

Reception
The character and Ackles' portrayal in the third season of the television series adaptation have received a positive media reception.

Ackles' cover of Blondie's "Rapture" received additional praise from the band itself, with original singer Debbie Harry describing the rendition as "epic".

References

The Boys characters
American comics characters
American superheroes
British comics characters
Characters created by Garth Ennis
Comics characters introduced in 2009
Comics characters introduced in 2011
Comics characters who can move at superhuman speeds
Comics characters with accelerated healing
Comic martial artists
Comics characters with superhuman strength
Comics superheroes
Comics supervillains 
Male superheroes
Male supervillains
LGBT supervillains
LGBT superheroes
Dynamite Entertainment characters
Fictional assassins in comics
Fictional characters who can manipulate light
Fictional bisexual males
Fictional gay males
Fictional characters with anti-magic or power negation abilities
Fictional characters with energy-manipulation abilities
Fictional characters with fire or heat abilities
Fictional characters with nuclear or radiation abilities
Fictional characters with post-traumatic stress disorder
Fictional characters with slowed ageing
Fictional characters with superhuman senses
Fictional mass murderers
Fictional military personnel in comics
Fictional prisoners of war
Fictional shield fighters
Fictional super soldiers
Fictional United States Army Rangers personnel
Fictional Vietnam War veterans
Fictional World War II veterans
Male characters in television
Superhero television characters
United States-themed superheroes